James Hamilton (born 1884; date of death unknown) was an English footballer who played at left-back for Burslem Port Vale and Oldham Athletic in the 1900s.

Career
Hamilton joined Burslem Port Vale from Burslem Town in March 1903. He played six Second Division games in the 1903–04 season, and went on to play 23 league and two FA Cup games in the 1904–05 campaign. He missed just four of the club's 38 league games of the 1905–06 season and went on to make 33 league appearances in the 1906–07 campaign. However, he was forced to leave the Athletic Ground after the club went into liquidation in 1907. He moved on to Oldham Athletic.

Career statistics
Source:

Honours
Oldham Athletic
Football League Second Division second-place promotion: 1909–10

References

Sportspeople from Burslem
English footballers
Association football fullbacks
Port Vale F.C. players
Oldham Athletic A.F.C. players
English Football League players
1884 births
Year of death missing